Bulger is a census-designated place in Smith Township, Pennsylvania, United States.  The ZIP Code is 15019.  Bulger was a coal mining town and was the birthplace of football player Doug Russell.  Among the companies located in Bulger were the Pittsburgh Coal Company, the Bulger Block Coal Company, and the Verner Coal & Coke Company.  As of the 2010 census the population was 407 residents.

Demographics

References

External links 
Map

Census-designated places in Washington County, Pennsylvania
Census-designated places in Pennsylvania